Wang Luming (November 1915 – September 28, 2005) was a Chinese diplomat. He was Ambassador of the People's Republic of China to Sweden (1972–1974).

References

1915 births
2005 deaths
Ambassadors of China to Sweden